Carmel College and variants may refer to:

Carmel College

Australia
 Carmel Adventist College, Seventh-day Adventist day college in Perth, Western Australia.
Carmel College, Thornlands, a catholic secondary college in Redland City, Queensland.

India
 Carmel College, Mala, a Christian college for girls in Mala, Kerala

New Zealand
 Carmel College, Auckland, a Catholic school for girls in Auckland

United Kingdom
 Carmel College, Darlington, a catholic school in Darlington, County Durham, England
 Carmel College, Oxfordshire, a defunct Jewish independent school
 Carmel College (St Helens), Catholic sixth form college in Merseyside, England

Carmel High School

India
 Carmel Garden Matriculation Higher Secondary School, Coimbatore, India
 Carmel High School (Nagercoil), a Catholic school in Ramanputhoor, Nagercoil, Tamil Nadu

United States
 Carmel High School (Carmel, California)
 Carmel High School (Mundelein, Illinois)
 Carmel High School (Indiana)
 Carmel High School (Carmel, New York)

In fiction
 Carmel High School, a fictional school in Ohio from the TV series Glee

Carmel School

Australia
 Carmel School, Perth, Jewish day school in Perth, Western Australia

Hong Kong
 Carmel School (Hong Kong) (迦密中學), a secondary school

India
 Carmel School (Giridih), a Catholic school in Giridih, Jharkhand
 Carmel Garden Matriculation Higher Secondary School, Coimbatore
 Carmel School, Padmanabhanagar, a Catholic school in Padmanabhanagar, Bangalore
 Carmel School, Rourkela, a Catholic school in Rourkela, Odisha

Kuwait
 Carmel School (Kuwait), a Catholic school in Safat